Vuelve is the fourth studio album by Puerto Rican singer Ricky Martin. Sony Discos and Columbia Records released it on February 12, 1998. Martin worked with producers KC Porter, Robi Draco Rosa, and Desmond Child to create the album. Following the worldwide success of the song "María" from his previous album, A Medio Vivir (1995), Martin returned to the studio and began recording material while on tour. Vuelve is a Latin record with Latin dance numbers and pop ballads. "María" caught the attention of FIFA, who asked Martin to write an anthem for the 1998 FIFA World Cup being held in France. Martin subsequently recorded "La Copa de la Vida", composed by Porter, Rosa, and Desmond Child for the World Cup.

Critics' reviews of the album were generally positive; they praised its uptempo tracks and its production, though some criticized it for containing too many ballads. Martin received several accolades, including the Best Latin Pop Performance at the 41st Annual Grammy Awards in 1999. Vuelve debuted at number one on the US Billboard Top Latin Albums chart and peaked at number forty on the Billboard 200. Martin's performance of "La Copa de la Vida" on the Grammy Awards show was credited for boosting the album's sales. Certified  platinum by the Recording Industry Association of America (RIAA), it sold more than 888,000 copies in the United States, standing as the 10th best-selling Latin album in the country. Vuelve reached number one in Norway, Portugal, and Spain, as well as the top 10 in seven other countries, including Australia and Italy. As of 2008, the album had sold over six million copies worldwide.

Vuelve spawned six singles: its title track, "Vuelve", "La Copa de la Vida", "La Bomba", "Perdido Sin Ti", "Por Arriba, Por Abajo", and "Casi un Bolero". "Vuelve" and "Perdido Sin Ti" both reached number one on the Billboard Hot Latin Songs in the US while "La Copa de la Vida" became an international hit in both Europe and South America. For promotion, Martin embarked on the worldwide Vuelve tour performing in Asia, Australia, Europe, Mexico, South America, and the United States.

Background and recording

In 1995, Ricky Martin released his third studio album, A Medio Vivir. On it, he shifted from his traditional ballad-style compositions to a riskier fusion of music focused on traditional Latin sounds, epitomized by the song "María". Taken aback by the starkly different musical style, his record label executives felt the song would ruin Martin's career. Despite this, "María" was chosen as the album's second single and became a breakthrough success, reaching number one in France, Spain, Germany, Belgium, Holland, Switzerland, Finland, Italy, Turkey, and the whole of South America. As of 2014, A Medio Vivir has sold over three million copies worldwide. "María" caught the attention of FIFA. They contacted Martin in the middle of his tour and asked him to write an anthem for the 1998 World Cup; Martin subsequently recorded "La Copa de la Vida" composed by KC Porter, Desmond Child, and fellow ex-member of Menudo Robi Draco Rosa. According to the vice president of marketing at Sony Music Europe, Richard Ogden, FIFA chose Martin because he "exemplified all of the ideals that organizers of the famed football (soccer) tournament wanted us to try to embody in music".

While on tour in 1997, Martin returned to the studio and began recording material for his fourth studio album. He said the experience of touring and recording at the same time was "brutal and incredibly intense". On December 7, 1997, Martin confirmed he was completing his next project and that the album would be released in February of the following year. He worked on the album with producers Porter and Rosa, and recorded it in studios across the United States, Puerto Rico, and Spain. The album's title, Vuelve, was announced on January 25, 1998. In an interview with CNN en Español, he emphasized it was going to "reaffirm the internationalization of my career and I know that it will help me a lot to destroy the stereotypes that may exist with my culture".

Composition and lyrics 

Vuelve is a Latin album composed of 14 songs, consisting mainly of "red-hot" Latin dance numbers and "melodramatic" pop ballads. The uptempo tracks "Lola, Lola" and "La Bomba" mix the musical styles of salsa and rumba with jazz, rock, and pop. On "Por Arriba, Por Abajo", Martin asks the saints to have his love interest dance with him. It is a samba-influenced track, accompanied by African chants and "wicked horn blasts". "La Bomba" is influenced by the Puerto Rican dance of the same name; its lyrics discuss how the singer gets drunk from the rhythm. The song features Cuban musician Paquito Hechavarría on the piano. "Lola, Lola" is an uptempo number, on which the singer sings about the women he desires. The title track, penned by Venezuelan singer-songwriter Franco De Vita, is a "sultry" love song with a gospel chorus and includes the narrator pleading with Martin's love interest to return as she gives meaning to his life. In a 2007 interview with Estudio Billboard, De Vita recalled he had been writing the song for 10 years when Martin asked him to compose a track for the album. "Corazonado" and "Perdido Sin Ti" are ballads with "aching, slower-paced narratives", with the latter track being a "bedroom staple with a dreamy hook and a simmering feel". "Casi un Bolero" is a bolero about an artist "[o]bsessed with his own broken heart and threatening to die if his lover does not return". An instrumental version of the song was recorded for Vuelve, which serves as the closing track.

"Hagamos el Amor" is an orchestrated ballad with a string arrangement and a "brooding" piano". "La Copa de la Vida", the official theme for the 1998 World Cup, is a samba song featuring various instruments including bells, whistles, horns, trumpets, and percussion. On the song, Martin declares life is a competition where one has to "dream to be the champ". "Así es la Vida" is as "openly pop as it is romantic" and includes a chorus in the background. Martin recorded two cover songs in Spanish for the album: "Marcia Baila" and "Gracias por Pensar en Mi". Les Rita Mitsouko originally performed "Marcia Baila", and was a success in France in the 1980s. "Gracias por Pensar en Mi" is an adaptation of "A Via Lactea" by Legião Urbana from their album A Tempestade ou O Livro dos Dias (1996). Renato Russo had written it months before he died of AIDS. The narrator for "Gracias por Pensar en Mi is a person close to dying. Vuelve also features the song "No Importa la Distancia", the Spanish-language version of "Go the Distance" by Michael Bolton from the movie Hercules. It was released as a single for the Latin American edition of the Hercules soundtrack in 1997 and peaked at number 10 on the Latin Pop Airplay chart.

Singles

The title track was released as the album's first single on January 26, 1998. It was his first number-one song on the Billboard Hot Latin Songs chart in the US. The song became a top five hit in Guatemala, El Salvador, and Panama, and on Mexico's ballads chart. It reached number one in Costa Rica, El Salvador, Guatemala, Honduras, Nicaragua, Peru, and Venezuela. The track was the theme song for the Mexican telenovela Sin ti (1997). "La Copa de la Vida" was released as the second single on March 9, 1998. The song grew to be an international success, appearing on the charts in more than 60 countries, and reaching number one in 30 countries, including Australia, Belgium (Wallonia), Costa Rica, El Salvador, France, Germany, Italy, Panama, Spain, Nicaragua, Sweden, Switzerland, Venezuela, as well as topping the European Hot 100 Singles chart. It peaked at number two in Norway,  as well as on the ballads chart in Mexico, and the Hot Latin Songs chart in the US. The song has been ranked as the best World Cup anthem of all-time by multiple publications.

The third single from Vuelve, "La Bomba", was released on June 16, 1998; it reached number five in Spain, number 27 on the Hot Latin Songs chart, and ranked on several charts in Europe and Australia. The album's fourth single, "Perdido Sin Ti", was released on August 18, 1998, and became Martin's second number one on the Hot Latin Songs chart. "Por Arriba, Por Abajo", was the fifth single to be released from Vuelve on November 3, 1998; it reached number 13 in Spain and number 33 on the Hot Latin Songs chart. The album's final single, "Casi un Bolero", was launched on December 21, 1998. "Corazonado" was released as a promotional single in the US and peaked at number 20 on the Hot Latin Songs chart. Music videos were filmed for "Vuelve", "La Copa de la Vida", "La Bomba", "Perdido Sin Ti", and "Por Arriba, Por Abajo".

Marketing

Release
Sony Music released Vuelve in Puerto Rico on February 12, 1998. Martin was on hand for the album's launch. It was released on the same day in the United States, February 24 in Spain, and the following month across the rest of Europe and Southeast Asia. To promote Vuelve in Asian markets, Sony Music Asia released a promo CD containing three versions of "María", and "The Cup of Life" (the English-language version of "La Copa de la Vida"). Sony Music Japan launched the album in the label's native country on March 25, 1998, to coincide with Martin's advertisement campaign for Suzuki. The European edition of Vuelve includes the Spanglish radio edit of "La Copa de la Vida" while the Australian adds the radio edit of "María" as well; neither features the instrumental rendition of "Casi un Bolero". The Japanese release includes the three aforementioned tracks. For the Asian market, the album includes two more remixes of "La Copa de la Vida" in addition to a remix of "La Bomba", the Spanglish rendition of "Casi un Bolero" and Martin's previously-recorded songs "Corazón", "Dónde Estarás", and "Te Extraño, Te Olvido, Te Amo". Martin advertised Vuelve on Siempre en Domingo in Mexico and Hey Hey It's Saturday in Australia.

Live performances
To further promote Vuelve, Martin embarked on the worldwide Vuelve Tour; he performed in Asia, Australia, Europe, Mexico, South America, and the United States. The day after releasing the album, Martin held two sold-out concerts at the 30,000-seat Hiram Bithorn Stadium in Puerto Rico on February 13 and 14, 1998, respectively. In South America, he performed in Argentina, Chile, Colombia, Peru, and Venezuela. His shows in Venezuela and Peru were held as benefit concerts, the former as part of "A Venezuela Without Drugs" campaign, and the latter for the Foundation for Children of Peru . Martin also participated in the second annual "Festival Presidente de Música Latino" in the Dominican Republic on June 26, 1997, where he had top billing for the event. In Asia, he toured in India, China, Japan, Malaysia, and Singapore. A concert was planned for Indonesia in May of the same year but was cancelled because of anti-government rioting. In the US, he performed at the Miami Arena in Miami, the Arrowhead Pond in Anaheim, and Madison Square Garden in New York. His sold-out performance at the Arrowhead Pond grossed over $446,805 which landed it at number 10 on the Boxscore chart on November 7, 1998. For this achievement, the concert's promoter, the Nederlander Organization, presented Martin with the Estrella del Pond Award. His show at Madison Square Garden grossed $632,180 placing it second on the Boxscore chart of November 10.

A 14-piece band accompanied Martin during his tour, which included four backup vocalists alongside percussion and brass sections.  His hour-and-45 minute show consisted of 17 tracks of uptempo numbers and ballads from Vuelve and his earlier career. Aside from the tour, Martin sang "The Cup of Life" live at the 1998 FIFA World Cup Final in France, on the halftime show at the Dallas Cowboys-New England Patriots football game at the Estadio Azteca in Mexico City, and the 1999 Grammy Awards. Billboard's John Lannert criticized Martin's presentation in Puerto Rico for the uneven number of slow-tempo and dance numbers as well as the awkward pauses when he changed outfits off-stage. The Los Angeles Times critic Ernesto Lechner felt that Martin "showcased his slick, masterfully composed pop material" at his show at the Arrowhead Pond but remarked that the singer "might have served himself and his fans better by performing a handful of nights at a more intimate venue than the Pond".

Critical reception

Vuelve was met with generally favorable reviews from music critics with the uptempo tracks receiving with the most positive reactions. AllMusic's Jose F. Promis complimented Martin over how it "effectively balances" dance tracks and ballads. He cited "La Copa de la Vida" as the main highlight but preferred the original version on the album to the English-language adaption. He also lauded the other dance numbers from the record. John Lannert of Billboard magazine compared Vuelve to A Medio Vivir as a "like-minded package of meaty, bitter-sweet romantic ballads and chest-pumping, upbeat numbers". He felt the uptempo songs had the potential to be a hit. Vilma Maldonado of The Monitor praised the record as "creative history" and its production as "seamless" and mentioned that "La Copa de la Copa" stands out the most. Writing for Vista magazine, Carmen Teresa Roiz described the record as a metamorphosis for Martin; she regarded it as the culmination of his music career in "all his splendor".

In the San Antonio Express-News, Ramiro Burr remarked Martin "took careful notes" following the success of "Maria" as Vuelve "continues in that same party fever vein but with more intensity". Burr complimented Porter for being able to maintain the "right balance between the gorgeous R&B drive of the horn and high-energy pop rhythms" on the production and commented that the ballads "serve only as breaks from dancing". David Wild of Rolling Stone touted the record's "extremely polished and infectious Latin pop that's immediately accessible even to dogged English-speaking types". The Miami Herald editor Leila Cobo wrote a positive review of Vuelve; she called the album a "collection of baila-able tunes interspersed with catchy pop ballads and felt the arrangements make it "stand above the often heavily synthesized Latin pop fray". For The Dallas Morning News, Mario Tarradell complimented the singer for "showing a refreshing flair for diversity". He regarded the dance tunes "Lola, Lola", "La Bomba", and "Marcia Baila" as the best tracks on the album.

Critics, however, were divided on the ballads. Promis found some of them forgettable, particularly on the second half of the record. Maldonado found the hook on the title track to be "instant and unforgettable" a sentiment shared by Roiz whereas Cobo criticized it as one of the weakest songs from the album and felt its choruses were "irritating" as they overshadowed Martin's voice. Burr's only complaint about Vuelve was the inclusion of "No Importa la Distancia", describing it as "sappy" which Tarradell similarly expressed as an "unwelcome dose of sugary pap". Tarradell also opined that the ballads "fell into excess" and called the instrumental version of "Casi un Bolero" an "overkill" although he praised "Vuelve" and "Perdido Sin Ti". The Los Angeles Times Lechner commended Martin's vocal ability on the album to "handle both ballads and up-tempo tunes" and cited the title track would make the album "most likely survive the test of time". In addition, he admired "Hagamos el Amor" for its "sly use of the orchestral passages, passionate delivery, and an overall mood that belongs only to an album by a real artist" despite recognizing the title of the song. Richard Torres of Newsday, writing a positive review of Vuelve, was more receptive of the ballads. He complimented Martin's "soulful falsetto" on "Corazonado", the "sweetness" of "Perdido Sin Ti", and the "gospel-ish intensity" on the title track.

Accolades
At the 10th Annual Lo Nuestro Awards in 1998, Vuelve received a nomination for Pop Album of the Year, but lost to Me Estoy Enamorando by Alejandro Fernández. At the 41st Annual Grammy Awards in 1999, Martin won the Grammy Award for Best Latin Pop Performance for Vuelve.  At the 1999 Billboard Latin Music Awards, it won Pop Album of the Year by a Male Artist, and El Premio de la Gente for Male Pop Artist or Group and Album of the Year at the Ritmo Latino Music Awards in the same year. In 2015, the album was listed among Billboards  50 Essential Latin Albums of the 50 Past Years. An editor opined, "Pop and dance beats never sounded so good."

Commercial performance
In the US, Vuelve debuted atop the Billboard Top Latin Albums the week of February 28, 1998, succeeding Me Estoy Enamorando.  The album spent 26 weeks in this position. Billboards Lannert credited its success on Valentine's Day weekend sales. On the US Billboard 200, Vuelve debuted at number 81. A year after its release, sales of Vuelve climbed after Martin's performance of "La Copa de la Vida" at the Grammy Awards. The album ended 1998 as the second best-selling Latin album (after Me Estoy Enamorando), and the best-selling Latin record the following year in the US. His rendition, along with anticipation of Martin's first English-language album, helped the former to peak at number 40 on the Billboard 200. According to Nielsen SoundScan, Vuelve has sold over 888,000 copies in the US, making it the 10th best-selling Latin album in the country . It was certified platinum by the Recording Industry Association of America (RIAA) for shipping over 1,000,000 units. In Canada, Vuelve reached number three on the RPM chart and number 11 on the Canadian Albums Charts; it was certified double platinum for shipping 200,000 copies in Canada. Over 1.5 million copies of the album have been shipped in Latin America. Vuelve has been certified triple platinum in both Argentina and Mexico, and platinum in the respective countries of Peru and Uruguay.

Vuelve debuted atop the Spanish Albums Chart on the March 4, 1998, issue. It was certified six-times platinum by the Productores de Música de España (PROMUSICAE), shipment of over 600,000 copies in Spain. The album also peaked at number one on the Portuguese Albums Chart, and received a platinum certification from Associação Fonográfica Portuguesa (AFP) denoting shipments of over 40,000 copies in Portugal. Vuelve debuted at number 34 on the Norwegian Albums Chart. In its fifth week on the chart, it peaked at number one and stayed on the top for three consecutive weeks. It became Martin's first number-one album in Norway, and was certified gold by International Federation of the Phonographic Industry (IFPI) Norway for selling over 25,000 copies in the country. In Sweden, Vuelve debuted at number 29 on the albums chart on April 10, 1998. After fluctuating on the chart for 17 weeks, on July 31, 1998, it reached its peak at number two. The album was certified platinum by the Swedish Recording Industry Association (GLF), denoting shipments in Sweden of over 80,000 copies. It received a platinum certification from the IFPI signifying sales of 1,000,000 copies in Europe, and as of 2006, over 2.1 million copies have been shipped in the region.

In Southeast Asia, Vuelve was certified gold in Singapore and platinum in Indonesia, Taiwan, and Thailand. In Malaysia, the record reached number three on the albums chart, while it peaked at number 19 on Japan's Oricon Albums Chart, and was certified gold in both countries. In Turkey, Vuelve certified sextuple platinum for sales of 180,000 copies, making it the best-selling album in the country by an international solo artist. Vuelve shipped over one million copies in Asia and had sold over six million copies worldwide by 2008.

Track listing

Personnel 

Credits for Vuelve adapted from AllMusic and the album liner notes.

Recording and mixing locations 

 Ocean Way Recording, Los Angeles
 Worldbeat Recording, Calabasas
 Disney Studios, Burbank
 Criteria Studios, Miami
 South Beach Studios, Miami
 Centlemania Club Studio, Miami
 Rumbo Recorders, Canoga Park
 LAFX Studios, North Hollywood
 After Hours Studios, Miami
 The Bunny Hop Studios, Studio City
 O'Henry Studios, Burbank
 Circle House Studios, Miami
 Capitol Studios, Hollywood
 Eurosonic Studios, Madrid
 Studio 56, Hollywood
 Alpha Recording Studios, Puerto Rico
 Tone King Studios, Hollywood

Musicians and technical 

 Michael Aarvold – mixing assistant
 Andy Abaz – tres
 Luis Aguino – percussion (Brazilian), trumpet
 Josie Aiello – background vocals
 Mike Ainsworth – mixing assistant
 Rusty Anderson – acoustic guitar 
 Jonathan Antin – stylist
 Iris Aponte – project coordinator
 Karla Aponte – composer
 Carmit Bachar – background vocals
 Steve Bartek – orchestration
 John Beasley – piano 
 Marcelo Berestovoy – acoustic guitar
 Curt Bisquera – drums 
 Phillipe Bourgués – acoustic guitar
 Chris Brooke – mixing assistant
 Robbie Buchanan – keyboards, piano
 Ed Calle – Metales
 Kari Cameron – bass 
 Karl Cameron – engineer
 David Campbell – orchestration
 Chris Carroll – mixing assistant
 Teresa Cassin – assistant engineer
 Gloria Cheng – piano 
 Fred Chichin – composer
 Desmond Child – arranger, composer, producer
 Steve Churchyard – engineer
 Tony Concepcion – trumpet, flugel horn 
 Luis Conte – percussion 
 Ricardo Cordero – background vocals
 Joseph Lito Cortés – acoustic guitar, background vocals
 Orion Crawford – arranger, orchestration
 Franco De Vita – composer
 David Dominguez – assistant engineer
 G.B. Dorsey – background vocals
 Bruce Dukov – concertmaster
 Charles Dye – engineer, mixing
 Luis Enrique – percussion
 Luis Gómez Escolar – composer, Spanish adaptation
 Benny Faccone – engineer, mixing
 Kenneth Faulk – Metales
 Robert Fernandez – engineer
 Jesus "Chuy" Flores – engineer
 Marco Flores – composer
 Humberto Gatica – mixing
 Jim Gilstrap – background vocals
 Francisco Manuel  – palmas
 Ruiz Gómez – palmas
 Rich Gomez – acoustic guitar
 Jules Gondar – engineer
 Paul Gordon – assistant engineer
 Reggie Hamilton – bass 
 Katrina Harper – background vocals
 Paquito Hechavarria – piano 
 Femio Hernández – engineer
 Leo Herrera – mixing assistant
 Bunny Hull – background vocals
 Matt Hyde – engineer
 Ingram – background vocals
 Ethan James – Hurdy Gurdy
 Jorge M. Jaramillo – assistant Engineer
 Brian Jenkins – engineer
 Mortonette Jenkins – background vocals
 Marlena Jeter – background vocals
 Maxine Jeter – background vocals
 Jo Ann Kane – copyist
 John Karpowich – engineer
 Todd Keller – mixing assistant
 Erik Kerly – French horn 
 Scott Kieklak – assistant engineer
 John Kricker – trombone 
 Michael Landau – electric guitar 
 Cesar Lemos – arranger, composer
 Gene Lo	Assistant – engineer
 Manny López – guitar 
 Renato López – composer
 John Lowson – engineer
 Ángel "Angie" Machado – Brazilian percussion
 Ricky Martin – primary artist, Spanish adaptation, background vocals
 Peter McCabe – engineer
 Ángelo Medina – associate producer
 Alan Menken – composer
 Dwight Mikkelsen – copyist
 Lee Moore – stylist
 June Murakawa – mixing assistant
 Kristle Murden – background vocals
 Kieran Murray – assistant engineer
 René Juan De La Cruz Napoli – graphic design
 Rick Nelson – background vocals
 Carlos Nieto – engineer
 Meia Noite – Brazilian percussion
 Rafael Padilla – percussion
 Rik Pekkonen – engineer
 Tony Peluso – mixing
 Archie Peña – arranger, percussion 
 Phil Perry – background vocals
 Stella Petrova – background vocals
 Darryl Phinnessee – background vocals
 Alberto Pinto – assistant engineer
 Jeff Poe – engineer
 Javier Pontón – composer
 Mike Porcaro – bass 
 KC Porter – arranger, composer, multiple instruments, electric piano, producer, programming
 Luis Quine – mixing assistant
 Leo Quintero – cuatro 
 John "J.R." Robinson – drums
 Lázaro Rodriguez – guitar 
 Angelina Rosa – background vocals
 Héctor Iván Rosa – engineer
 Robi Rosa – arranger, background vocals, bass programming, composer, engineer, palmas, piano, producer
 Juan Rosario – assistant engineer
 Keith Rose – engineer
 William Ross – orchestration
 Bob Rothstein – mixing assistant
 Renato Russo – composer
 Iris Salazar – assistant engineer
 Rafa Sardina – assistant engineer
 Jeffrey Shannon – assistant engineer
 Jackie Simley – background vocals
 Bill Smith – assistant engineer
 Travis Smith – mixing assistant
 Rafael Solano – percussion 
 Luis Fernándea Soria – engineer
 Stephanie Spruill – background vocals
 Lance Staedler – photography
 Ramón Stagnaro – acoustic guitar 
 Ted Stein – engineer
 Neil Stubenhaus – bass 
 Sarah Sykes – project coordinator
 Dana Taboe – trombrone 
 Michael Thompson – guitar
 Francisco "Pancho" Tomaselli – assistant engineer
 Carmen Twillie – background vocals
 Robert Valdez – assistant engineer
 Camilo Valencia – arranger
 Jose Luis Vega – background vocals
 Danny Vicari – engineer
 Esteban Villanueva – engineer, project coordinator
 Luis Felipe Villanueva – assistant engineer
 Randy Waldman – piano 
 Julia Waters – background vocals
 Oren Waters – background vocals
 Peter Yussi Wenger – acoustic guitar 
 John West – background vocals
 Doc Wiley – engineer
 Maxine Willard Waters – background vocals
 Juan Vincente Zambrano – arranger, keyboards, programming
 David Zippel – composer

Charts

Weekly charts

Year-end charts

All-time charts

Certifications and sales

Release history

See also

 1998 in Latin music
 List of best-selling albums in Turkey
 List of best-selling Latin albums
 List of best-selling Latin albums in the United States
 List of number-one Billboard Top Latin Albums from the 1990s
 List of number-one Billboard Latin Pop Albums from the 1990s
 List of number-one singles of 1998 (Spain)

References

1998 albums
Ricky Martin albums
Albums produced by Draco Rosa
Spanish-language albums
Albums produced by Desmond Child
Sony Discos albums
Grammy Award for Best Latin Pop Album
Albums produced by K. C. Porter